The Avia B.122 was a Czechoslovak single-seat biplane aerobatic aircraft, which was developed in the mid-1930s. It saw some service in the first years of World War II.

History
In the spring of 1934, the Czechoslovak Army Command decided that some Czechoslovak Air Force pilots would participate in the international aerobatic competition Coupe Mondiale held at Vincennes, Paris, on 9–10 June. For this purpose, the Czechoslovakian aircraft manufacturer Avia was given the task of designing and constructing an aircraft. The prototype, B.122, was presented after only six weeks.

The Czechoslovak pilots had only a few weeks to learn and master the aircraft as the competition was to be held in July 1934. Luckily, the design was quite successful and the Czechoslovak pilots managed to win the 4th (František Novák) and the 8th (Ján Ambruš) place in the competition.

Afterwards, the aircraft was modified, based on the pilots' inputs, and this resulted in the improved version, Ba.122. The Ba.122 was equipped with larger rudder and ailerons on both upper and lower wings. On the occasion of 1936 Summer Olympics in Berlin International Aerobatic Contest, "Internationaler Kunstflugwettbewerbs" was run by the German Aeroculub, "Aeroklub von Deutschland". Czechoslovak pilots won 2nd (Petr Široký), 3rd (František Novák) and 8th place (Ján Ambruš)  with their Avias. In this contest new engine Avia RK-17 was introduced, with aircraft Ba.122.7 (OK-AWE), Ba.122.8 (OK-AWA). 1937 was also a successful year, as the Avias managed to win 1st and 3rd place at the International Aviation Meeting in Zurich in July/August 1937. Some of these aircraft were equipped with nine-cylinder Walter Pollux engines to fit into category of aeroplanes with engines above 20L. These successes led to export orders from the Soviet Union and Romania. The aircraft was later further developed into prototypes Ba.222, Ba.322 and Ba.422. The Czechoslovak Ministry of Defence ordered 45 Bs.122 trainers. However, the outbreak of World War II put an end to further development. Some Avias ended up in the German Luftwaffe when parts of Czechoslovakia were absorbed into Nazi Germany in 1939. Other aircraft were sold to the Slovakian and Bulgarian air forces.

Variants

B.1223 prototype machines with Walter Castor II engine, B-122.2 and .3 later modified to Ba.122 standard
Ba.122improved variant with ailerons on both wings and enlarged rudder, mostly with Avia RK-17 engine
Ba.222Ba.122 with NACA cowling and wheel pants
Ba.422Ba.122 with upper gull wing to improve front visibility in inverted flight
Bš.122Military trainer variant of the Ba.122, staggered wings, Walter Castor II engine  
B.322Bš-122 with enclosed cockpit and Townend cowling

Production
 B/Ba.122: 60 machines, serials B.122.1-Ba.122.45,  Ba.122.101-115 (series for Soviet Union)
 Bš.122: 45 machines
 Ba.222: one prototype
 Ba.322: one prototype
 Ba.422: 2 machines

Operators

 Bulgarian Air Force – 12 Bs 122 aircraft taken over from the Czechoslovak Air Force, named ″Vosa″ (″Wasp″) 
 Czechoslovakian Air Force – 45 Bš.122 and 45 B/Ba.122 aircraft
 Luftwaffe – 12 aircraft taken over from the Czechoslovak Air Force
 Royal Romanian Air Force – one machine, Ba-122.40, YR-DPO
 Slovak Air Force (1939–45)
 Soviet Air Force – 15 Ba.122 aircraft

Specifications (Ba.122)

Data from Němeček, Václav – Československá letadla

See also

References

Single-engined tractor aircraft
Biplanes
B.122
1930s Czechoslovakian military trainer aircraft
Aircraft first flown in 1934
Aerobatic aircraft